Bould Wood is a  biological Site of Special Scientific Interest north of Shipton-under-Wychwood  in Oxfordshire.

This site is mainly ancient semi-natural woodland, but it also has two streams, a pond and a wet meadow. The lower plant flora is diverse. Fungi include tricholoma toadstools and Cudoniella clavus, while there are lichens such as Cladonia polydactyla, Catillaria prasina and  Graphis scripta.

References

 

Berkshire, Buckinghamshire and Oxfordshire Wildlife Trust
Sites of Special Scientific Interest in Oxfordshire